Dulce María Loynaz Muñoz (Havana, Cuba; 10 December 1902 – 27 April 1997) was a Cuban poet, and is considered one of the principal figures of Cuban literature. She was awarded the Miguel de Cervantes Prize in 1992. She earned her Doctorate in Civil Law at University of Havana in 1927.

Early life
Dulce María Loynaz was the daughter of the famous General Enrique Loynaz del Castillo, a hero of the Cuban Liberation Army and author of the lyrics of the march theme, "El Himno Invasor", and sister of poet Enrique Loynaz Muñoz. Dulce María was born in Havana, Cuba on December 10, 1902, to a family of great sensibility towards artistic and cultural manifestations and deep patriotic feelings. Homeschooled as a child, Loynaz grew up in a familiar environment highly propitious for poetry.

Although Loynaz had a sheltered childhood, her early adulthood was much more adventurous, including experiences available at that time only to wealthy young women, even outside of Cuba. She published a number of poems in her teens and twenties.

Education 
She completed the Doctorate of Civil Law at the University of Havana in 1927, but rarely practiced law, and stopped practicing altogether in 1961 out of dislike. She was able to travel widely. In addition, her talents and her family's social position brought her into personal contact with some of the major Spanish-language authors of the century, including Spanish author Federico García Lorca, Chilean poet Gabriela Mistral who won the Nobel Prize in Literature in 1945, Cuban author Alejo Carpentier, and the Spanish writer Juan Ramón Jiménez who won the Nobel Prize in Literature in 1956.

Publications and Poetry 
Loynaz published her first poems in La Nación in 1920. She traveled extensively including to Turkey, Syria, Libya, Palestine, and Egypt. Loynaz also visited Mexico in 1937 and various countries in South America from 1946 to 1947, and the Canary Islands in 1947 and 1951 where she as declared adoptive daughter.

Loynaz began writing Jardin in 1928 and completed the novel in 1935, shortly after Cuban women obtained the right to vote. During these early decades of the twentieth century, a time of great feminist activity, a dynamic and effective women's movement flourished in Cuba, and women's rights became part of the Cuban political consciousness. The feminist attitude Loynaz displays in Jardin is tied strongly to the image of the city. The novel begins and ends with the heroine looking out from the garden toward a city that resembles Havana.

In 1950, she published weekly chronicles at different publications of the epoch such as El País, Excélsior, Social, Grafos, Diario de la Marina, El Mundo, Revista Cubana, Revista Bimestre Cubana and Orígenes. In 1953, she attended as the university's guest, celebrations that marked the 700th year since the naming of Salamanca University.

Her book Poemas sin nombre (Untitled Poems) was translated to Italian in 1955. She participated in conferences and readings, not only in Cuba but also in Spain and Latin America. She was elected as a member of the Arts and Literature National Academy in 1951, of the Cuban Academy of Language in 1959 and the Spanish Royal Academy of Language in 1968.

The Royal Academy of Spanish Language nominated her for the Miguel de Cervantes Prize in 1984. In 1985, Poesías Escogidas (Selected Poems) and Bestarium (a book of poems written before 1959) were published in Havana. During these years, she participated in conferences, gave speeches, and received prizes and awards bestowed by different Cuban cultural institutions.

The sobriety of her lyric expression, her exquisite handling of language, and master use of Castilian language were the main reasons taken into account to confer her the King Alfonso X the Wise Order and on November 5, 1992, the Miguel de Cervantes Prize, an honorable distinction she received in Spain in 1992 from King Juan Carlos I's hands. This is considered the Nobel prize in the world of the Spanish literature.

In 1959 she voluntarily stopped writing and publishing in Cuba. In a situation such as Cuba's over the past 40 years, it is not surprising that a person as private in temperament as Dulce María Loynaz would seclude herself, or that her public statements have always been extremely discreet, patriotic, and yet non-political. More perplexing is the fact that, according to all her closest friends, she entirely stopped writing poetry when the Revolution triumphed in 1959. Although her work was characterized by so many of her friends as a private vocation, perhaps the total disappearance of the social world which fostered it, silenced her.

The discovery of her work by a large and enthusiastic audience in her home country when she was in her 80s, really for the first time and after more than 25 years of internal exile, must have been like the return of the dove in her poem, “Noah,” carrying the green branch that signifies a safe harbor. Fe de vida (Life's Faith), her last work, saw the light in 1993, while celebrating in Pinar del Río, the First Ibero American Meeting about her work and life. Furthermore, some texts from her delicate creation have been adapted into music by different singers and songwriters.

She received several awards among them: National Order of Carlos Manuel de Céspedes, Order of Félix Varela of the Culture, National Culture Distinctive Award, the Alejo Carpentier Medal (Cuba), and The Civil Order of Alfonso X the Wise in 1947. She was awarded the Cuban National Prize for Literature (1987).

Death 
Dulce María Loynaz died in 1997 and was interred in the Colón Cemetery, Havana.

Work

 Versos (Verses). Madrid, 1950.
 Canto a la mujer esteril, 1938.
 Juegos de agua. Versos del agua y del amor, 1947.
 Obra lirica, 1955.
 Ultimos dias de una casa, 1958.
 Poesias escogidas, 1984.
 La novia de Lazaro, 1991.
 Poesia completa, 1993.
 Antologia lirica, 1993.
 Finas redes, 1993.
 Poemas escogidos, 1993.
 Miel imprevista (anthology), 1997.
 Melancolia de otoño, 1997.
 Diez sonetos a Cristo, 1998.
 El aspero sendero, 2001.
 Poemas sin nombre (Nameless Poems). Aguilar.
 Bestiarium (Bestiary). Poems
 Poemas naúfragos (Shipwrecked poems). Editorial Letras Cubanas, 1991.
 Jardín (Garden). Lyric novel. Aguilar, Madrid, 1951.
 Un verano en Tenerife (A summer in Tenerife). Memoir. Aguilar, Madrid, 1958.
 Carta de Amor al Rey Tut-Ank-Amen (Love Letter to King Tutankhamen).
 Poems Without Name. Bilingual: English translations by Harriet de Onís. Editorial José Martí, 1993.
 A woman in her garden: selected poems of Dulce Maria Loynaz. Dulce María Loynaz; Judith Kerman, 2002.

See also 

 Caribbean literature
 Cuban literature
 Caribbean poetry

Further reading
English
 Modern Spanish American poets. First series / María Antonia Salgado, 2003
 A place in the sun?: Women writers in Twentieth-century Cuba / Catherine Davies, 1997
 Tropics of history: Cuba imagined / Alan West, 1997
 “Dulce María Loynaz: A Woman Who No Longer Exists” / Ruth Behar, Michigan Quarterly Review, Fall 1997, 529–537.
 Feminist readings on Spanish and Latin-American literature / Lisa P Condé, 1991

Spanish
La música del agua: poesía y referencia en la obra de Dulce María Loynaz / María Lucía Puppo, 2006
Contra el silencio: otra lectura de la obra de Dulce María Loynaz / Zaida Capote, 2005
Jardín, Tenerife y poesía: fe de vida de Dulce María Loynaz / Virgilio López Lemus, 2005
Dulce María Loynaz cien años después / Humberto López Cruz, 2004
Dulce María Loynaz: estudios de la obra de una cubana universal / Virgilio López Lemus, 2000
Escrituras poéticas de una nación: Dulce María Loynaz, Juana Rosa Pita y Carlota Caulfield / Jesús J Barquet, 1999
Margen acuático: poesía de Dulce María Loynaz / Asunción Horno Delgado, 1998
Un encuentro con Dulce María Loynaz / Vicente González Castro, 1994
Homenaje a Dulce María Loynaz: obra literaria, poesía y prosa, estudios y comentarios / Ana Rosa Núñez, 1993
Dulce María Loynaz / Pedro Simón, 1991
Tres poetas hispanoamericanos: Dulce María Loynaz, Jaime Torres Bodet, José Martí / Alicia G R Aldaya, 1978

External links
 Website about Dulce María Includes pictures, poems in English and in Spanish by Dulce María.
 Poems by Dulce María in Spanish.
 The Poets.
 Dulce

1902 births
1997 deaths
Premio Cervantes winners
Cuban women poets
20th-century Cuban women writers
20th-century Cuban poets
University of Havana alumni